Rehema Dida Jaldesa (born 29 July 1971) is a Kenyan politician. She is the current women representative of Isiolo County in the Kenya National Assembly since 23 August 2017. Jaldesa previously served as leader of the opposition for Isiolo county from 2013–2017.

References

External links 
 

Living people
Jubilee Party politicians
1971 births